Sara Petrov (born August 26, 1982 in Toronto, Ontario) was a synchronized swimmer.  She is currently studying for an MBA at Cornell.

Biography

Sara commenced the sport of synchronized swimming at the age of eight at the Olympium in Etobicoke.  She went on to compete provincially, nationally and internationally for Canada, winning a bronze medal at team routine of the World Aquatic Games in Japan in 2001.  

She later attended the University of Alabama Birmingham where she majored in Economics at the business school and also competed in the sport of synchronized swimming in the NCAA, winning a number of medals. She was four times named an 'honorary' All-American and an Academic All American.

Sara is currently a student at The Johnson School, Cornell University, studying for an MBA.

References

1982 births
Living people
Canadian synchronized swimmers
Swimmers from Toronto
UAB Blazers athletes